The Papua Presidium Council was a 31-member umbrella group that was established to represent Indonesia's West Papua voice for the region's more autonomy within Indonesia and not necessarily independence. It is not only representing papuan groups but also migrants from other Indonesia islanders. It is commonly referred to as PDP among the Papuans.

The Presidium presides the Papua Council, which is claimed as a re-emerged form of the New Guinea Council, established in 1961, which was approved and gazetted by the Kingdom of the Netherlands .

The Presidium members are chosen from members of the Panel of Papua. Papua Panel itself consists of pillar groups. The Papua Council has four pillar groups: political detainees and prisoners (Tapol/Napol), women, the TPN/OPM, and West Papuan Youth and Customary Council of West Papua. Theys Eluay was one of the heads of the PDP until his killing by Kopassus in 2001.

The result of these efforts lead to formation of 100 members team of papuan who met President Habibie as well as his successors president Wahid. The result of which is the special autonomy law which is the result of papuan national congress in 2000.

The legitimacy of the council has been challenged by the West Papua New Guinea National Congress, a rival organisation.

References

Western New Guinea